The Ticonic Footbridge, popularly known as the Two Cent Bridge or the Two Penny Bridge, is a suspension bridge that spans the Kennebec River between the city of Waterville and the town of Winslow in Kennebec County, Maine. It is one of the oldest surviving wire-cable steel suspension bridges and also is considered to be the last known extant toll footbridge in the United States.

History
The original footbridge was constructed in 1901 by Edwin Dwight Graves of the Berlin Construction Company. The bridge was owned by Ticonic Foot Bridge Company, which gave the bridge its official name. It was intended to give workers coming from Temple Street in Waterville easy access to Hollingsworth & Whitney Company (later Scott Paper Company) mills across the Kennebec in Winslow. The original toll was one cent, which was collected at a booth on the Waterville side of the river. However, less than a year after its opening on December 15, 1901, the bridge was washed away by high water levels.

The bridge was rebuilt in 1903. The second incarnation of the Ticonic proved to be sturdier, and continued to serve the local population for many years. The toll crossing rose to two cents, where the bridge derived its common name. In 1960 the toll was abolished altogether, when the Ticonic Foot Bridge Company presented the bridge to the city of Waterville as a gift.

Preservation and restoration
The Two Cent Bridge was added to the National Register of Historic Places in 1973. While considerable efforts have been put into maintaining the bridge, it has been closed at various points over the years when conditions have made foot crossings unsafe.

On July 4, 1990, the Two Cent Bridge suffered severe structural damage when hundreds of people attending a nearby concert converged on the footpath, straining the bridge's weight and tension limits. The bridge was immediately closed and stabilized; complete restoration took several years. The historic tollbooth was removed but was later restored and replaced at the bridge.

In 2012, the bridge was rehabilitated for continued pedestrian use. The metal grate deck and horizontal wind cables were replaced, and the lattice railing was removed and replaced with a modern railing.

Currently, many civic organizations in the Waterville–Winslow area, including the local Rotary Club, dedicate funds to the bridge's upkeep.

See also 
 Hollingsworth & Whitney Company
 National Register of Historic Places listings in Kennebec County, Maine
 List of bridges on the National Register of Historic Places in Maine

References

Former toll bridges in Maine
Suspension bridges in Maine
Bridges completed in 1903
Pedestrian bridges in the United States
Bridges on the National Register of Historic Places in Maine
Bridges in Kennebec County, Maine
Tourist attractions in Kennebec County, Maine
Buildings and structures in Waterville, Maine
Winslow, Maine
Waterville, Maine
1901 establishments in Maine
1901 disestablishments in Maine
1903 establishments in Maine
National Register of Historic Places in Kennebec County, Maine
Pedestrian bridges on the National Register of Historic Places
Steel bridges in the United States